Lutheran Immigration and Refugee Service is a non-profit organization that welcomes and supports refugees and migrants entering the United States. It is one of nine refugee resettlement agencies working with the Office of Refugee Resettlement and one of only two that serves unaccompanied refugee minors. LIRS also advocates for just policies and practices relating to immigration and detention.

As an organization, LIRS originates from the response of American Lutherans in 1939 to the needs of Europeans displaced because of World War II, but the roots of the organization reach back to the 1860s when the New York Ministerium and the Pennsylvania Ministerium joined together to help and protect Lutheran immigrants in the US. Since then the organization's scope has expanded to include any refugees entering the US, support for asylum seekers and migrants, and services to unaccompanied children (UACs).

LIRS continues to be a faith-based organization and celebrates strong collaborative relationships with the Evangelical Lutheran Church in America and the Latvian Evangelical Lutheran Church in America.

The current president and CEO is Krish O'Mara Vignarajah (2019–present).

References

External links 
 

Lutheran organizations
Organizations established in 1939
Non-profit organizations based in Maryland
Organizations based in Baltimore
Refugee aid organizations in the United States
Migration-related organizations based in the United States
1939 establishments in the United States